Mkhambathini Local Municipality is an administrative area in the UMgungundlovu District of KwaZulu-Natal in South Africa. Mkhabathini is the isiZulu name derived from the Zulu word eMkhambathini meaning the place of acacia trees.

Mkhambathini is well located in relation to Durban and Pietermaritzburg and adjoins Cato Ridge, a potential industrial node. The N3, which is identified in the Spatial Growth and Development Strategy as a provincial corridor, runs east–west through the central part of the municipal area.

Main places
The 2001 census divided the municipality into the following main places:

Politics 

The municipal council consists of fourteen members elected by mixed-member proportional representation. Seven councillors are elected by first-past-the-post voting in seven wards, while the remaining seven are chosen from party lists so that the total number of party representatives is proportional to the number of votes received. In the election of 1 November 2021 the African National Congress (ANC) won a majority of nine seats on the council.

The following table shows the results of the 2021 election.

References

External links
 http://www.mkhambathini.gov.za/

Local municipalities of the Umgungundlovu District Municipality